The Russian Cup 2009–10 was the eighteenth season of the Russian football knockout tournament since the dissolution of Soviet Union. The competition started on April 20, 2009 and  finished with the Final held on 16 May 2010.

First round
This round featured 7 Second Division teams and 1 amateur team. The games were played April 20 and 3 May 2009.

Section South

Section Ural-Povolzhye

Second round
In this round entered 4 winners from the First Round and the 58 Second Division teams and 2 amateur teams. The matches were played from April 24 to May 14, 2009.

Section West

Section Center

Section East

Section South

Section Ural-Povolzhye

Third round
In this round entered 32 winners from the Second Round and the 16 remaining Second Division teams. The matches were played from May 14 to June 7, 2009.

Section West

Section Center

Section South

Section Ural-Povolzhye

Section East

Fourth round
In this round entered 24 winners from the Third Round teams. The matches were played from June 5 to June 18, 2009.

Section West

Section Center

Section South

Section Ural-Povolzhye

Section East

Fifth round
In this round entered 12 winners from the Fourth Round teams and the 20 First Division teams. The matches were played on July 1, 2009.

|}
Note: Roman numerals in brackets denote the league tier the clubs participate in during the 2009 season.

Round of 32
In this round entered 16 winners from the Fifth Round teams and the all Premier League teams. The matches were played on July 15, 2009.

Note: Roman numerals in brackets denote the league tier the clubs participate in during the 2009 season.

Round of 16
The matches were played on August 5, 2009.

Note: Roman numerals in brackets denote the league tier the clubs participate in during the 2009 season.

Quarter-finals
The matches were played on April 7, 2010. Amkar Perm was awarded a walkover after FC Moscow were relegated to the amateur league.

Note: Roman numerals in brackets denote the league tier the clubs participate in during the 2010 season.

Semi-finals
The matches were played on April 21, 2010.

Final
The match was played on 16 May 2010.

Played in the earlier stages, but were not on the final game squad:

FC Zenit Saint Petersburg:  Kamil Čontofalský (GK),  Kim Dong-Jin (DF),  Radek Šírl (MF), Aleksei Ionov (MF), Igor Semshov (MF),  Syarhey Karnilenka (FW),  Danko Lazović (FW), Pavel Pogrebnyak (FW).

FC Sibir Novosibirsk:  Nenad Erić (GK), Sergei Chepchugov (GK), Roman Amirkhanov (DF),  Tomáš Vychodil (DF), Kirill Orlov (DF), Nikolai Samoylov (DF), Maksim Astafyev (MF), Aleksandr Vasilyev (MF), Yevgeni Zinovyev (MF), Denis Laktionov (MF), Nikolay Lipatkin (MF),  Mantas Savėnas (MF), Roman Belyayev (FW),  Gennadi Bliznyuk (FW),  Goran Stankovski (FW), Sergei Shumilin (FW).

External links
 Official page 
 Russian Cup on rsssf.com

Russian Cup seasons
Cup
Cup
Russian Cup